Park is an English and Scottish surname. Notable people with the surname include:

 Charlotte Park (1918–2010), American painter 
Craig Park (born 1986), South African cricketer 
 Daphne Park (1921–2010), British spy
 Harry Jonathan Park (1868–1927), American businessman and politician 
 James Park (disambiguation), multiple people 
 John Mungo-Park (1918–1941), Royal Air Force fighter pilot and flying ace of the Second World War 
 Keith Park (1892–1975), New Zealand air force commander 
 Maria Hester Park (1760–1813), Born as Maria Hester Reynolds, British composer, pianist, and singer
 Michael Park (actor) (born 1968), American actor
 Mungo Park (explorer) (1771–1806), Scottish explorer
 Mungo Park (golfer) (1836–1904), Scottish golfer
 Nick Park (born 1958), English animator and director 
 Nigel Park (1921–1942), New Zealand flying ace of the Second World War
 Ray Park (born 1974), Scottish actor, author and martial artist 
 Robert E. Park (1864–1944), American urban sociologist
Robert L. Park (1931-2020), American physicist and pseudo-science critic
 William Hallock Park (1863–1939), American bacteriologist

See also
 Park (disambiguation)
 Park (Korean surname)
 Parks (surname)

English-language surnames
Scottish surnames